Bad Sneakers and a Piña Colada is the second full-length album by Swedish hard rock band Hardcore Superstar, released by Music for Nations. It was the first album to be released internationally and usually considered the first full-length album in general. The title comes from the jazz-rock band Steely Dan's song "Bad Sneakers".

In May 2000, Billboard listed Bad Sneakers as #7 in the top 10 albums in Sweden.

Track listing

Personnel

Principal band members
 Jocke Berg - vocals
 Thomas Silver - guitar
 Martin Sandvik - bass
 Magnus "Adde" Andreasson - drums

References

2000 albums
Hardcore Superstar albums
Glam metal albums
Heavy metal albums by Swedish artists